Harpenden Common Golf Club is a private members' golf club in Harpenden, Hertfordshire.

Although golf has been played on Harpenden Common since 1895, Harpenden Common Golf Club itself was founded in 1931 when Harpenden Golf Club moved to a new course at Hammonds End. The similarities between the two clubs' names has been known to create confusion for visiting golfers but once visitors are redirected to the club on Cravells Road they can expect a warm welcome. After a major revision to the course in 1996, the golf course consists of eleven holes on the original common and seven new holes on private land in an area known as the Jockey Field.

Notable Members 

The club's most famous member is Ken Brown who joined as a junior member in 1969 and also worked as a green keeper at the club. Ken acknowledged his attachment to the club during his professional playing career. Ken frequently discusses goings on at '"the Common"' during his BBC commentary at major golf tournaments. Ken was recently joined by the mayors of Harpenden and St Albans in May 2013 when he officially opened the newly developed clubhouse.

The Golf Course 

The golf course is partly based on Harpenden Common and partly on private land owned by the Club (known as the Jockey Field. The holes in the Jockey Field were added in 1996 and were designed by club member and Ryder Cup player Ken Brown. At the same time some of the holes on the Common were amended and lengthened. Some of the original holes on the Common which are no longer used as part of the course now provide excellent practice facilities for the members of the club and visitors.

The golf course at Harpenden Common Golf Club has a number of interesting or unusual features:

 Holes 1 to 5, 8 to 11, and 17 to 18 are played on Harpenden Common which is public common land.
 The approach shot to the 2nd green is played over a public road called Cross Lane;
 The 3rd fairway includes the cricket square and pitch on which Bamville Cricket Club play cricket on Sunday afternoons between May and September each year. At times when cricket is being played, the 3rd hole is played as a par three hole from past the cricket pitch.
 The 4th and 5th holes are consecutive par threes, a rare occurrence on British golf courses;
 Tee shots on the 8th and 9th holes are played over public roads Cross Lane and Limbrick Road respectively.
 The copse of trees between the 8th green and 9th tee mark the site of the "paddock" which is all that remains of the historical horse races that were held on the Common between the 1830s and 1914.
 The course ends with a par three. This is relatively unusual on golf courses but does enable members on the terraces and balconies of the clubhouse to watch the entire final hole of important matches from their seats.

The Club is private though guests are allowed at most times, subject to course availability; a handicap certificate may be requested in order to establish proficiency.

The golf course has three tees – "Ladies" (red tees), "Visitors" (yellow tees) and "Medal" (white tees).

Current Layout 

Men's card (since 1996)

The course record for the current golf course layout is 63 and is held by Sam Claridge.

Ladies' card (since 1996)

Hertfordshire County Honours 

Harpenden Common Golf Club has frequently produced good amateur players who have performed well at the County level.

Source:

References 

Sports venues completed in 1931
1931 establishments in England
Golf clubs and courses in Hertfordshire
Organisations based in Hertfordshire
Harpenden